Harderwijk is a hamlet in the northwestern Netherlands. It is located in the municipality of Opmeer, North Holland,  about 11 km north of Hoorn.

References

Populated places in North Holland